Billy Boyle is an Irish actor and singer on British film, television and stage. His recording career included five 45rpm singles for the Decca and Columbia labels, including the novelty song "My Baby's Crazy 'Bout Elvis" (Decca F 11503) in 1962. He is also a veteran of the West End stage, having played leading roles in over 15 hit shows. In his first West End musical, Maggie May, he was nominated as best newcomer. Gower Champion then chose him to play Barnaby in Hello Dolly at The Theatre Royal Drury Lane. He appeared in Canterbury Tales at the Phoenix Theatre as The Clerk of Oxford. Harold Hobson, The Times critic said, "He was a breath of fresh air in the West-End". He went on to play leading roles in No Sex Please, We're British, Billy, What's a Nice Country, The Rivals, Love, Lust, & Marriage, Some Like it Hot, Disney's Beauty and the Beast, and in the original cast  of Dirty Dancing. Lately he has appeared as Grandpa George and Grandpa Joe in Charlie and The Chocolate Factory at Drury Lane. In 2010, he was the Mysterious Man in the Regent’s Park Open Air Theatre production of Into the Woods. In 2016, he was Major Bouvier and Norman Vincent Peale in the smash hit Grey Gardens. He followed this playing Arvide in Guys and Dolls at the Phoenix Theatre in the West End. He has had his own very successful television series in Ireland, It's Billy Boyle, as well as leading roles in Trail of Guilt, the award-winning The Grass Arena and The Bretts, as well as many guest appearances in EastEnders, The Professionals, Coronation Street, Father Ted, etc. In the late 1970s, Boyle was cast as Ronald McDonald in the European TV commercials and in all print media for the fast-food chain McDonald's. He was the last 'straight man' to Basil Brush on BBC1's The Basil Brush Show and later presented  Dance Crazy for ITV, on the history of dance, with Lesley Judd. Lately he has been seen in Dirk Gently, for BBC Four and Lead Balloon. His many films include Stanley Kubrick's Barry Lyndon, Groupie Girl, Side by Side, Shergar, Wild Geese II, The Scarlet and the Black,  Round Ireland with a Fridge and A United Kingdom.

Filmography

2021 Swede Caroline

Stage

References

External links
 

Place of birth missing (living people)
Year of birth missing (living people)
Living people
Irish male stage actors
Irish male television actors